The Real World: D.C., (occasionally known as The Real World: Washington D.C.), is the twenty-third season of MTV's reality television series The Real World, which focuses on a group of diverse strangers living together for several months in a different city each season, as cameras follow their lives and interpersonal relationships. It is the fifth season of The Real World to be filmed in the Mid-Atlantic States region of the United States.

The season featured eight people who lived in a house in Dupont Circle. Washington, D.C. was officially announced as the location for the newest season on June 10, 2009. Filming began on July 2, 2009 and completed on October 12, 2009. The season's December 30, 2009 premiere  was watched by 1.9 million viewers. The March 31, 2010 season finale was watched by 1.1 million viewers, the record low at the time for a season finale of The Real World. The finale was immediately followed with a reunion special, The Real World: Washington D.C. Reunion. Overall the season averaged 1.5 million viewers a week and consisted of 14 episodes.

According to MTV's President of Programming, Tony DiSanto, "The charged atmosphere of Washington D.C., the center of our country's social and political change, will provide an electric setting for this next season of The Real World. We are thrilled to be filming our classic franchise in the heart of where history is being made ... it adds a whole new dimension to the great characters and drama our viewers expect and love from The Real World." Washington, D.C. Mayor Adrian Fenty welcomed the production, pointing to the impact of young people on the national scene.

The Washington Capitals hockey team, singer Melissa Etheridge and Washington Post cartoonist Tom Toles make guest appearances this season, in which they interact with the cast. President Barack Obama also appears in two episodes in which cast member Andrew Woods, an aspiring cartoonist, attends a press conference with Washington Times senior correspondent Joe Curl as part of Woods' internship with the newspaper, and when cast member and LGBT rights activist Mike Manning attends the October 10, 2009 Human Rights Campaign dinner at which Obama spoke. Manning also meets with Congressman Jared Polis of Colorado and Congressman James P. Moran of Virginia during the course of his work for the HRC.

Season changes
As with The Real World: Brooklyn, the Washington, D.C. cast was not given a group assignment, and was free to pursue their own interests. Various cast members are seen throughout the season pursuing career opportunities, bartending, and participating in internships and charity work with local businesses and organizations.

The residence

The cast members lived in a 10,800 ft2 (1,003 m2) house located at 2000 S Street, NW in Dupont Circle, a neighborhood known for its historic buildings, embassies, dining establishments, and its gay community. The cast members' four-story brownstone mansion was originally constructed in 1891 for a Baltimore and Ohio Railroad executive, James Mosher, and his new wife, Minnie. The building is a contributing property to the Dupont Circle Historic District and its property value is $5,692,000. It is now the permanent home of the Laogai Museum.

Four building permits were issued in May 2009, including one for demolition of the interior walls. Building plans show the first floor includes bedrooms, a game room, the Confessional, and a control room for the show's producers. The second floor includes the common area, telephone room, kitchen, bathrooms, and five "love sacks". The main control room is located on the home's third floor, while a conference room and offices are located on the fourth floor.

Cast
As with the previous two seasons, the cast includes eight members. Local bars that were used as frequent hangouts for cast members included Halo, located in nearby Logan Circle; Town Danceboutique, located in Shaw; and The Russia House, located one block west of the cast's house. The cast also attended local sporting events, such as a D.C. United soccer games at RFK Stadium. 

: Age at time of filming.

Episodes

After filming

The Real World: Washington D.C. Reunion premiered on March 31, 2010, following the season finale. It was hosted by Maria Menounos, and featured the entire cast, as they discussed the various aspects of their relationships during filming, and their lives after filming ended. Among the topics that were discussed were Andrew's continuing relationship with Andrea, who moved into a new home with him in Colorado, instances in which Ashley was perceived to be malicious, Erika's difficulties and feelings about Josh's singing, Josh's infidelity and different personas, Mike's bisexuality, and the cast's feelings about Ty's behavior when drunk.

Regarding their lives since filming, Andrew returned to school, and continued his painting while tending bar. Callie returned to school to study photography and public relations while working at a cafe. Emily returned to school, and began waitressing, while spending her free time with rock climbing, yoga, and playing on an intramural football team. She is trying her hand at social work at a refugee and immigration center, and dreams of working abroad one day. She also mentioned that she was enjoying dating women, and discussed her family's reaction to her newfound bisexuality. Erika moved to Cleveland.  Josh returned to Philadelphia, and continued with Wicked Liquid, which put out an EP on iTunes, and is also working on a solo project, but explains, in reference to the pain his infidelity caused his ex-girlfriend, that he is remaining single for the time being. Mike is studying part-time to be a personal trainer, and also attends Bible study. He had recently got a job as a host on a TV show. Ty returned to Baltimore, where he engages in his passions for modeling and acting, and tries to spend time with his brother, something that has been difficult to do over the past six years. Following two years of silence, Ashley and her mother reestablished their relationship.

Mike Manning went on to pursue an acting career. He appeared on Cloud 9, Hawaii Five-0, Love Is All You Need?, and produced the documentary Kidnapped for Christ.

Ashley Lindley went on to pursue an acting career with credits in a few 2011 productions, including a bit part in Birds of a Feather. In 2014, she married Daniel Shaffer and spoke up about battling a debilitating infection. 

Emily Schromm, who now lives in Denver, was voted as the winner of Women's Health's America's Next Fitness Star in August 2014, and was thus featured in a series of fitness DVDs. In 2019, Schromm published her first book, titled The Process.

On August 12, 2020, Ty Ruff was arrested and booked on a DUI charge.

The Challenge

Challenge in bold indicates that the contestant was a finalist on the Challenge.

References

External links

The Real World: D.C. at the Internet Movie Database
The Real World: D.C. at mtv.com
Cast page for The Real World: D.C. at mtv.com
Mike Manning's Homepage
"D.C. cast members of 'The Real World' show off their house", video by The Washington Post
"Tour the Rooms of 'The Real World: D.C.'", video by WRC-TV

Dupont Circle
Television shows set in Washington, D.C.
D.C.
2009 American television seasons
2010 American television seasons
Television shows filmed in Washington, D.C.